Radicals is a left-wing political party in Greece and member of the Coalition of the Radical Left. It was founded in 2009 following a split from Active Citizens.

External links
Official website 

Socialist parties in Greece
Political parties established in 2009
Components of Syriza